Natasha Fourouclas (born 31 January 1994) is a South African tennis player.

Fourouclas has career-high WTA rankings of 474 in singles, achieved on 23 July 2012, and 1059 in doubles, set on 5 August 2019.

Since her debut for the South Africa Fed Cup team in 2011, she has reached a win–loss record of 4–0.

ITF finals

Singles (0–6)

Doubles (1–0)

Fed Cup participation

Singles (1–0)

Doubles (3–0)

External links
 
 
 
 

1994 births
Living people
Sportspeople from Limassol
South African female tennis players
African Games bronze medalists for South Africa
African Games medalists in tennis
Competitors at the 2011 All-Africa Games
21st-century South African women